Hodges House may refer to:

in the United States
(by state then city)
Peter B. Hodges House, Yuma, Arizona, listed on the National Register of Historic Places (NRHP) in Yuma County
Hodges House (Bismarck, Arkansas), listed on the NRHP in Hot Spring County
Hodges House (Carrollton, Illinois), NRHP-listed in Greene County
Blankenship-Hodges-Brown House, Paragon, Indiana, listed on the NRHP in Morgan County
Hodges House (Cotton Valley, Louisiana), listed on the NRHP in Webster Parish
Hodges House (Taunton, Massachusetts), NRHP-listed in Bristol County
Hodges-Runyan-Brainard House, Artesia, New Mexico, listed on the NRHP in Eddy County
Hodges-Sipple House, Artesia, New Mexico, listed on the NRHP in Eddy County
Eugene Wilson Hodges Farm, Charlotte, North Carolina, listed on the NRHP in Mecklenburg County
Hodges-Hardy-Chambers House, Wichita Falls, Texas, listed on the NRHP in Wichita County

See also
Hodgson House (disambiguation)